Canton of Wormhout is an administrative division, located in Nord département and Hauts-de-France région in France. All communes of the canton of Wormhout are part of the arrondissement of Dunkirk.

Since the French canton reorganisation which came into effect in March 2015, the communes of the canton of Wormhout are:

 Arnèke
 Bambecque
 Bavinchove
 Bissezeele 
 Bollezeele
 Broxeele
 Buysscheure
 Crochte
 Eringhem 
 Esquelbecq
 Hardifort
 Herzeele 
 Holque
 Hondschoote
 Houtkerque
 Hoymille
 Killem
 Lederzeele
 Ledringhem
 Merckeghem
 Millam
 Nieurlet
 Noordpeene
 Ochtezeele
 Oost-Cappel
 Oudezeele
 Quaëdypre
 Rexpoëde
 Rubrouck
 Saint-Momelin
 Socx
 Steenvoorde
 Terdeghem
 Volckerinckhove
 Warhem
 Watten
 Wemaers-Cappel
 West-Cappel
 Winnezeele 
 Wormhout
 Wulverdinghe
 Wylder
 Zegerscappel
 Zermezeele
 Zuytpeene

References

Cantons of Nord (French department)